Munday House is a historic home located near Denver in Catawba County, North Carolina. It was built about 1850, and was originally a one-room, one-story with attic, log house with a huge stone chimney. It was expanded by frame additions into the 1880s.

It was listed on the National Register of Historic Places in 1975.

References

Log houses in the United States
Houses on the National Register of Historic Places in North Carolina
Houses completed in 1850
Houses in Catawba County, North Carolina
National Register of Historic Places in Catawba County, North Carolina
Log buildings and structures on the National Register of Historic Places in North Carolina